The Poinsard 25 hp or Mengin Type B is a small, two-cylinder, air-cooled, horizontally opposed aircraft engine built in France. it was manufactured by Établissements Pierre Mengin from a design by René Poinsard. Power was around 19 kW (25 hp) at 2,280 rpm.

Design and development

The first two engines built by Mengin were designed by René Poinsard and are often referred to by his name The Mengin B or Poinsard 25 hp was the first and smaller of the two. Aimed at very small, single seat sport aircraft it went into production from about 1933. Production ceased when France was invaded in 1940.

Variants
Mengin B As below.
Mengin B gearedMaximum continuous  at 1,450 propeller rpm, take-off  at 1,580 propeller rpm.

Applications
Data from Horizontally Opposed Aero Engines unless other source indicated
 Bessard-Millevoye Moineau
 Botali-P.A.M.A.
 Brochet MB-30
 Eklund TE-1
 Gatard AG.01 Alouette (geared)
 Guilemin Sportplane (geared)
 JDM Roitelet
 Jodel D.93
 Mignet HM.8
 Mignet HM.14
 Nippi NH-1 Hibari
 Piel CP-10 Pinocchio
 SFCA Taupin
 Avia 50-MP

Specifications

References

Boxer engines
1930s aircraft piston engines